Government revenue or national revenue is money received by a government from taxes and non-tax sources to enable it to undertake public expenditure. Government revenue as well as government spending are components of the government budget and important tools of the government's fiscal policy. The collection of revenue is the most basic task of a government, as revenue is necessary for the operation of government, provision of the common good (through the social contract in order to fulfill the public interest) and enforcement of its laws; this necessity of revenue was a major factor in the development of the modern bureaucratic state.

Government revenue is distinct from government debt and money creation, which both serve as temporary measures of increasing a government's money supply without increasing its revenue.

Sources
There are a variety of sources from which government can derive revenue. The most common sources of government revenue have varied in different places and time periods. In modern times, tax revenue is typically the primary source of revenue for a government. Types of taxes recognized by the OECD include taxes on income and profits (including income taxes and capital gains taxes), social security contributions, payroll taxes, property taxes (including wealth taxes, inheritance taxes, and gift taxes), and taxes on goods and services (including value-added taxes, sales taxes, excises, and duties). Besides, lotteries can also bring in considerable revenue for the government. In early 2009, the Australian government used lotteries to boost spending, generating more than $60m in additional tax revenue for state governments. 

Non-tax revenue includes dividends from government-owned corporations, central bank revenue, fines, fees, sale of assets, and capital receipts in the form of external loans and debts from international financial institutions. Foreign aid is often a major source of revenue for developing countries, and for some developing countries it's the primary source of revenue. Seignorage is one of the ways a government can increase revenue, by deflating the value of its currency in exchange for surplus revenue, by saving money this way governments can increase the prices of goods.

Under a federalist system, sub-national governments may derive some of their revenue from federal grants.

Politics 
Most governments have a finance minister that oversees government revenue. Governments may also have a separate revenue service dedicated to the collection of revenue.

See also
List of countries by government budget
Ministry of Finance

References

Citations 

Fiscal policy